Whitewell Hotel is an historic building in the English parish of Bowland Forest Low, Lancashire. It is Grade II listed, built in 1836, and is in sandstone with a slate roof in two storeys with attics.  It consists of a cross wing at the left, and a long main range that has two gables with dormers.  The windows are mullioned with chamfered surrounds.  On the front is a gabled porch that has a doorway with a chamfered surround.  There are ball finials on all the gables.

See also
Listed buildings in Bowland Forest Low

References

Notes

1836 establishments in England
Houses completed in 1836
Grade II listed buildings in Lancashire
Hotels in Lancashire
Buildings and structures in Ribble Valley